Édgar Arnold Alarcón Tejada (born 9 May 1961) is a Peruvian accountant who served as Comptroller General of the Republic of Peru from June 9, 2016 to July 4, 2017. He was a Congressman representing Arequipa from 16 March 2020 until he was removed from office in April 2021. Alarcón belongs to the Union for Peru.

Early life and education 
Son of Diego Alarcón Carpio and Nancy Tejada Escobedo, he studied at the San Martín de Socabaya (Arequipa) and Manuel Muñoz Najar Schools, in the same town. Later, he would study Accounting at the National University of Saint Augustine, obtaining the bachelor's degree and later the Professional Degree in the same university house, although it was confirmed that his degree was fraudulent.

Career 
On June 9, 2016, he was appointed as Comptroller General of the Republic, despite this he was removed from his position on July 4, 2017.

On October 9, 2019, Alarcón was presented as the main Governor Advisor in the Regional Government of Arequipa headed by Elmer Cáceres Llica. On November 6, he resigned from that position, denouncing acts of corruption within the Regional Entity.

Political career 
During the 2020 Peruvian parliamentary election, he was elected a congressman by the Union for Peru on behalf of Arequipa, a position which he took office on March 16 of the same year. Likewise, on April 21, he was elected president of the Congressional Oversight Commission within the framework of the state of emergency due to the COVID-19 pandemic in Peru.

Alarcón was in favor of Vizcarra's vacancy during the two processes, the second of which ended up removing the former president from power. The congressman supported the motion being one of the 105 parliamentarians who voted in favor of the vacancy of President Martín Vizcarra.

In April 2021, he was suspended from his duties as a Congressman of the Republic for the duration of the criminal proceedings against him for alleged acts of corruption when he was Comptroller General of the Republic.

Controversies 
Alarcón was questioned for having named ex-congressman Juan José Díaz Dios as parliamentary coordinator of the Comptroller's Office.

When an alleged irregular purchase of computers by the Board of Directors of Congress was revealed, Alarcón ruled out any responsibility of Luz Salgado and José Cevasco, the latter responsible for the disputed acquisition, and was criticized for the phrase: "So much noise for five Millions!".

He is also accused of having recorded the conversations he had with some ministers of the ministerial cabinet such as Fernando Zavala (Prime Minister), Alfredo Thorne (former Minister of Economy) and Martín Vizcarra (former Minister of Transport).

On July 3, 2017, the Permanent Commission of the Congress of the Republic through Legislative Resolution No. 015-2016-2017-CR, in its first article, it was established: "The removal of Mr. Édgar Arnold Alarcón Tejada from the position of Comptroller General of the Republic, for which he was designated by Legislative Resolution No. 003-2015-2016 dated June 9, 2016... "and the vacancy of the Comptroller position was declared.

References 

1961 births
People from Arequipa
Peruvian accountants
Members of the Congress of the Republic of Peru
National University of Saint Augustine alumni
Union for Peru politicians
21st-century Peruvian politicians
Living people